Mingyue is a town of Liling City in Hunan Province, China. The town was established by merging the previous Hejiaqiao (贺家桥镇) and Dazhang (大障镇) on November 26, 2015. As of the 2015, the town had a population of 72,400 and an area of 169.1 square kilometers.

Administrative divisions

The town is divided into 16 villages and four districts: Dazhang 
district, Jianxiang district, Xiaoxiang district, Baizhouguo district, 
Dongjiang Village, Shuangqiao Village, Luojiakou Village, Jiangbianpu 
Village, Chaichong Village, Xinlian Village, Yanshan Village, Wanfu 
Village, Taojialong Village, Shenming Village, Wangjialong Village, 
Malian Village, Zhaijiang Village, Danzikeng Village, Wangjiaqiao 
Village, Xilin Village.

References

External links

Divisions of Liling